Dona Maria II (4 April 1819 – 15 November 1853) "the Educator" or "the Good Mother",  was Queen of Portugal from 1826 to 1828, and again from 1834 to 1853. Born in Rio de Janeiro, she was the first child of Emperor Dom Pedro I of Brazil and Empress Dona Maria Leopoldina, and thus a member of the House of Braganza. One of the two surviving children born when Pedro was still heir apparent to Portugal, she inherited Portuguese titles and was placed in the line of succession to the former Portuguese throne, even after becoming a member of the Brazilian imperial family, from which she was excluded in 1835 after her definitive ascension to the Portuguese throne.

Early life

Birth
Maria II was born Maria da Glória Joana Carlota Leopoldina da Cruz Francisca Xavier de Paula Isidora Micaela Gabriela Rafaela Gonzaga on 4 April 1819 in the Palace of São Cristóvão in Rio de Janeiro, Kingdom of Brazil. She was the eldest daughter of Prince Dom Pedro de Alcântara, future King of Portugal as Pedro IV and first Emperor of Brazil as Pedro I, and his first wife Dona Maria Leopoldina (née Archduchess Caroline Josepha Leopoldine of Austria), herself a daughter of Francis II, Holy Roman Emperor. She was titled Princess of Beira upon her birth. Born in Brazil, Maria was the only European monarch to have been born outside of Europe, though she was still born in Portuguese territory.

Succession crisis 
The death of Maria's grandfather, King Dom João VI, in March 1826 sparked a succession crisis in Portugal. The king had a male heir, Dom Pedro, but Pedro had proclaimed the independence of Brazil in 1822 with himself as Emperor. The late king also had a younger son, Infante Dom Miguel, but he was exiled to Austria after leading a number of revolutions against his father and his liberal regime.

Before his death, the king had nominated his favourite daughter, Dona Isabel Maria, to serve as regent until "the legitimate heir returned to the kingdom" — but he had failed to specify which of his sons was the legitimate heir: the liberal Emperor Dom Pedro I or the absolutist, exiled Miguel.

Most people considered Pedro to be the legitimate heir, but Brazil did not want him to unite Portugal and Brazil's thrones again. Aware that his brother's supporters were ready to bring Miguel back and put him on the throne, Pedro decided for a more consensual option: he would renounce his claim to the Portuguese throne in favor of his eldest daughter Maria (who was only seven years old), and that she was to marry her uncle Miguel, who would accept the liberal constitution and act as a regent until his niece reached the age of majority.

Miguel pretended to accept, but upon his arrival in Portugal, he immediately deposed Maria and proclaimed himself king, abrogating the liberal constitution in the process. During his reign, Maria traveled to many European courts, including her maternal grandfather's in Vienna, as well as London and Paris.

Absolutist uprising 

Maria's first reign was interrupted by the absolutist uprising led by her uncle, fiancé and regent Miguel, who proclaimed himself King of Portugal on 23 June 1828. Then began the Liberal Wars that lasted until 1834, the year in which Maria was restored to the throne and Miguel exiled to Germany.

The Marquis of Barbacena, arriving in Gibraltar with the princess on 3 September 1828, was informed by an emissary of what was happening in Portugal. He had the foresight to understand that Miguel had come from Vienna determined to put himself at the head of the absolutist movement, advised by Prince Klemens von Metternich, who was directing European politics, and so it was dangerous for the young Queen to go to Vienna. Taking responsibility, he changed the direction of the journey, and departed for London, where he arrived on 7 October. English policy was not conducive to its purpose. The Duke of Wellington's office openly sponsored Miguel, so the asylum the Marquis had sought was not safe. Maria II was received in court with the honors due to her high rank, but the British prevented their subjects or Portuguese emigres to go to reinforce the garrison of the island Terceira.

Miguel's coup d'état had not gone unopposed. On 16 May 1828, the garrison of Porto revolted, and in Lagos an infantry battalion did likewise. The revolts were stifled. Saldanha, Palmela, and others, who had come to take charge of the movement in Porto, re-embarked on the ship Belfast, which had brought them; the Porto garrison, reinforced by the academic volunteers of Coimbra and other liberal troops, emigrated to Galiza and from there to England. At the head of a small liberal expedition, the Marquis of Saldanha attempted to disembark in Terceira, Azores, but was not allowed to take the English cruise, whose vigilance he could not avoid for some time after the Count of Vila Flor, later of Terceira, was able to disembark. In time, because in August 1829 appeared in front of the island a huge Miguelist squadron that landed a body of disembarkation. Then there was the Battle of 11 August in the village of Praia, where the Miguelists were defeated. When the emigrants in England received the news of the victory, they felt great enthusiasm. They soon lost hope of knowing that the young queen was returning to the Brazilian Empire to her father. In fact, the situation of Maria II in the English court, next to the ministry in the power, became embarrassing and humiliating. The Queen left London to meet her future stepmother, Amélie of Leuchtenberg. They left together on 30 August 1829 for Rio de Janeiro, arriving on 16 October.

The constitutional cause was thought to have been lost. The dispersed emigres (France, England and Brazil) were divided into rival factions. Only Terceira Island recognized the constitutional principles, and even there appeared Miguelist guerillas. France was ready to recognize Miguel's government when the revolution of July broke out in Paris in 1830, which encouraged the Portuguese liberals.

Civil war 

On 7 April 1831, Dom Pedro I abdicated the imperial crown of Brazil on behalf of his son Dom Pedro II, Maria's younger brother, and came to Europe with his daughter and his second wife, to support his daughter's rights to the crown from Portugal and joined the forces loyal to Maria in the Azores in their war against Miguel. He took the title of Duke of Braganza, and Regent in her name.

Almost at the same time the regency of the Ilha Terceira, named by Pedro and composed of the Marquis of Palmela, the Count of Vila Flor and José António Guerreiro, prepared an expedition that soon took possession of the Azores. While extending the constitutional territory, Pedro disembarked in France, being welcomed with sympathy by the new government and by Louis Philippe I. Miguel's government had defied the immunities of French subjects, had not at once satisfied the complaints of the French government, which had sent a squadron commanded by Admiral Roussin to force the bar of Lisbon and impose humiliating conditions of peace.

Pedro left his daughter in Paris to finish her education, delivered to her stepmother, Empress Amélie, with good masters, and left for the Azores at the head of an expedition organized on the island of Belle Isle, bringing his supporters together. Arriving in the Azores on 3 March 1832, he formed a new ministry, assembled a small army, whose command he gave to the Count of Vila Flor, and carried him aboard a squadron which he delivered to the English officer Sartorius, and departed for mainland Portugal. 8 July at Memória Beach in Matosinhos. It was followed by the Siege of Porto and a series of battles until, on 24 July 1833, the Duke of Terceira entered victorious in Lisbon, having won the Battle of Cova da Piedade the day before. Porto and Lisbon, the main cities, were in the power of the liberals. Pedro came to Lisbon, and summoned his daughter from Paris, forcing his brother, Miguel to abdicate in 1834. Maria was thereupon restored to the throne, and obtained an annulment of her betrothal. Soon after her restoration to the throne, her father died from tuberculosis.

On 7 February 1833, in order to protect the Queen, the 2nd Lancers Regiment was created, first known as the Regimento de Lanceiros da Rainha (Queen's Lancers Regiment), with the motto Morte ou Glória, "Death or Glory" (the same as the 17th Lancers, since Lt. Col. Sir Anthony Bacon was its first commander), a fortunate coincidence since the queen's name was Maria da Glória.

Occupying the Portuguese throne, Maria II was still heir presumptive to her brother Pedro II as Princess Imperial of Brazil, until her exclusion from the Brazilian line of succession by law no. 91 of 30 October 1835.

Consolidation

Reign 

Maria married Auguste, Duke of Leuchtenberg, son of Eugène de Beauharnais and grandson of the Empress Josephine of France, on 26 January 1835, at the age of fifteen. However, he died only two months later, on 28 March 1835.

On 9 April 1836, Maria married the cultured and able Prince Ferdinand of Saxe-Coburg and Gotha. In accordance with Portuguese law, he was proclaimed King Dom Fernando II upon the birth of their first child and heir, Pedro.

In 1842, Pope Gregory XVI presented Maria with a Golden Rose.

Maria's reign saw a revolutionary insurrection on 16 May 1846, but this was crushed by royalist troops on 22 February 1847, and Portugal otherwise avoided the European Revolution of 1848. Maria's reign was also notable for a public health act aimed at curbing the spread of cholera throughout the country. She also pursued policies aimed at raising the levels of education throughout the country.

Death

From her first pregnancy at the age of eighteen, Maria II faced problems in giving birth, with prolonged and extremely difficult labor. An example of this was her third gestation, whose labor lasted 32 hours, after which a girl was baptized in articulo mortis with the name of Maria (1840).

At 25 years of age and in her fifth gestation, Maria II became obese and her births became even more complicated. In 1847, the fetal distress that preceded the birth of her eighth child – the Infante Augusto, Duke of Coimbra – brought to the world a child "quite purple and with little breathing".

The dangerous routine of successive pregnancies, coupled with obesity (which eventually caused her heart problems) and the frequency of dystocic births (worrisome, especially as a multiparous woman) led doctors to warn the queen about the serious risks she would face in future pregnancies. Indifferent to the warnings, Maria II merely replied: "If I die, I die at my post."

On 15 November 1853, thirteen hours after the onset of labor of the stillborn Infante Eugénio, her eleventh child, Maria II died at the age of 34. The announcement of death was published in the Government Gazette of 16 November 1853:

In a letter dated 28 November 1853, the Duchess of Ficalho, the queen's lady-in-waiting, reported the outcome to her brother, the 2nd Count of Lavradio:

Queen Maria II is remembered as a good mother and a kind person who always acted according to her convictions in her attempt to help her country. She was later given the nickname "The Good Mother".

Marriages and issue
Maria first married Auguste Charles, 2nd Duke of Leuchtenberg, son of Eugène de Beauharnais, grandson of Empress Josephine, who died soon after arriving in Portugal.

She then married Ferdinand of Saxe-Coburg and Gotha, son of Prince Ferdinand Georg August of Saxe-Coburg and Gotha and his wife Princess Maria Antonia Koháry de Csábrág.

Honours

National honours
 Grand Master of the Three Orders
 Grand Master of the Order of the Tower and Sword
 Grand Master of the Order of the Immaculate Conception of Vila Viçosa
 Sovereign and Grand Mistress of the Order of Saint Isabel
 : Dame Grand Cross of the Order of the Southern Cross

Foreign honours
 : Dame of the Order of the Starry Cross, 1st Class
 : Dame Grand Cordon of the Order of Saint Catherine, September 1850
 : Dame of the Order of Queen Maria Luisa, 27 May 1834
 : Knight of the Order of Order of Saint Januarius
 : Bailiff Knight Grand Cross with Collar of Justice of the Sacred Military Constantinian Order of Saint George

Ancestry

In literature 

In 1832, Letitia Elizabeth Landon published The Queen of Portugal, a poem protesting at her banishment and offering sympathy and hope for a peaceful restoration. This accompanied a vignette portrait of the Queen by James Holmes

See also

 Belenzada
 War of the Two Brothers
 September Revolution
 Cape Verde
 São Tomé and Príncipe
 Portuguese India
 Portuguese East Africa
 Macau
 Portuguese Angola
 Portuguese Guinea
 Portuguese Timor

Footnotes

References
 

|-

|-

|-

|-

1819 births
1853 deaths
Queens regnant in Europe
Dukes of Braganza
Brazilian people of Portuguese descent
Brazilian people of Austrian descent
Deaths in childbirth
Modern child monarchs
Portuguese infantas
Princesses Imperial of Brazil
Princesses of Grão-Pará
Princes of Beira
Dukes of Porto
House of Braganza
Princesses of Saxe-Coburg and Gotha
People from Rio de Janeiro (city)
19th-century Portuguese monarchs
19th-century women rulers
Duchesses of Leuchtenberg
People of the Liberal Wars
Knights Grand Cross of the Order of the Immaculate Conception of Vila Viçosa
Dames of the Order of Saint Isabel
3
3
3
Daughters of emperors
Burials at the Monastery of São Vicente de Fora